Wilfrid Mervyn Lusty (25 March 1907–31 May 1987) was a New Zealand journalist, drama critic, theatre administrator and adult educationalist. He was born in Auckland, Auckland, New Zealand on 25 March 1907.

References

1907 births
1987 deaths
New Zealand educators
People from Auckland
20th-century New Zealand journalists